Leslie Campbell may refer to:

Leslie D. Campbell Jr. (born 1925), American lawyer and politician
Leslie H. Campbell (1892–1970), president of Campbell University
Leslie Campbell Parks, daughter of the photographer Gordon Parks
Les Campbell (rugby league), New Zealand rugby league player
Leslie Campbell (cricketer) (1902–1970), Australian cricketer
Leslie Campbell (politician), Jamaican Senator and cabinet minister